Jovan Skerlić (20 August 1877 – 15 May 1914) was a Serbian writer and literary critic. He is seen as one of the most influential Serbian literary critics of the early 20th century, 
 after Bogdan Popović, his professor and early mentor.

Skerlić was buried in the Novo groblje cemetery in Belgrade.

Bibliography
His collected works include:

References

External links
Biography on SANU website

Bibliography
Midhat Begić, Jovan Skerlić et la critique littéraire en Serbie, Paris, Institut d’Études slaves 1963.

1877 births
1914 deaths
People from the Principality of Serbia
Serbian literary critics
Literary critics of Serbian
Members of the Serbian Academy of Sciences and Arts
Academic staff of the University of Belgrade
Writers from the Kingdom of Serbia